The Medal of the Royal Netherlands Meteorological Institute, or shortly KNMI Medal, is a royal decoration awarded by the Royal Netherlands Meteorological Institute (KNMI) to those officers or captains of the Dutch merchant navy who exceptionally support the Royal Netherlands Meteorological Institute by collecting and distributing observations about the weather at sea.

The medal is awarded in gold and silver.

Orders, decorations, and medals of the Netherlands
1870 establishments in the Netherlands